Giuseppe Kressevich (8 February 1916 – 13 April 1994) was an Italian racewalker who competed at the 1952 Summer Olympics,

References

External links
 

 

1916 births
1994 deaths
Sportspeople from Trieste
People from Austrian Littoral
Athletes (track and field) at the 1952 Summer Olympics
Italian male racewalkers
Olympic athletes of Italy
20th-century Italian people